Taishan is a station on the Taoyuan Airport MRT located on the border of Taishan and Xinzhuang, New Taipei, Taiwan. The station opened for commercial service on 2 March 2017.

Station overview
This elevated station has two side platforms. It opened for trial service on 2 February 2017, and for commercial service 2 March 2017.

History
 2 March 2017: The station opened for commercial service with the opening of the Taipei-Huanbei section of the Airport MRT.

Around the station
 Xinzhuang Culture and Arts Center
 Zhongping Junior High School
 Xinzhuang High School
 New Taipei City Xin Wu Tai Civil Sports Center

References

2017 establishments in Taiwan
Railway stations opened in 2017
Taoyuan Airport MRT stations
Transportation in New Taipei
Buildings and structures in New Taipei